The Battle Creek Tower is a mixed-use commercial and residential building located at 70 West Michigan Avenue in Battle Creek, Michigan. It was originally built as the Central National Tower, and designed as an office building. It was listed on the National Register of Historic Places in 2008.

History

The site of the Central National Tower was previously occupied by the Marjorie Block, built by cereal magnate C. W. Post and named after his only daughter Marjorie Merriweather Post. In 1929, Post's widow  Leila Post Montgomery sold the property to the Central National Bank. The bank hired the Chicago architectural firm of Holabird & Root to design a new headquarters for them on the site. Construction was completed and the building opened in mid-1931. The building served as the new headquarters for Central National Bank, and contained office space which was leased by prominent Battle Creek attorneys, physicians, dentists, accountants, and real estate agents.

Central National Bank maintained its offices until 1947, when it merged with Michigan National Bank and moved its offices to a different location. In 1951, the building was purchased by the Wolverine Insurance Company, which changed the name to Wolverine Tower. In 1978, the building became the Transamerica-Wolverine Tower, then the Transamerica Tower in 1984. In 2000, the Hinman Company purchased the building and renamed it the Battle Creek Tower. The Hinman Company redeveloped the building into a mixed use development, with the upper floors redesigned as residential space.
In 1961, one of Battle Creek’s civil defense air-raid sirens was installed on the roof of the building, where it still sits to this day and is now used for severe weather. It is tested monthly on the 1st Saturday at 1PM.

Description
The Battle Creek Tower is a twenty-one-story tower designed in the Art Deco style. It has a nearly square-plan tower located in front along Michigan Avenue, and a four-story section extending to the rear. The exterior of the tower is faced with buff-colored Indiana Oolitic limestone, perched on a black granite base. The front facade is 66 feet wide and symmetrical.  The main central entrance is set into a large square-head portal which is faced with gray granite. An American Flag and a Federal Thunderbolt Siren are both mounted atop the building. The third and seventeenth floors contain a series of carved limestone panels with stylized floral motifs. Deeply recessed vertical window banks on the tower emphasize the vertical lines of the tower.

References

		
National Register of Historic Places in Calhoun County, Michigan
Art Deco architecture in Michigan
Towers completed in 1931